North Lake School District may refer to:

North Lake School District (Oregon)
North Lake School District (Wisconsin)